The 1891–92 season was the 21st season of competitive football in England.

Events

Three new clubs joined the Football Alliance, following the expansion of the Football League to 14 teams, and the defection of Sunderland Albion to the Northern League. These new teams were Ardwick (later Manchester City), Burton Swifts and Lincoln City.

Everton left Anfield on 15 March 1892 after a dispute with the stadium's landlord, John Houlding. Everton moved into a new stadium at nearby Goodison Park, while Houlding formed a new football club—Liverpool F.C.—on 30 March 1892, to play at Anfield.

Preston North End set a new league record by winning 13 consecutive matches up to March 1892. A month later Sunderland equalled the record when they won their 13th successive game. The record of 13 consecutive wins in a single season stood for 125 years until broken by Manchester City in 2017.

Aston Villa recorded their biggest ever victory, defeating Accrington 12-2 on 12 March 1892.

National team
In the 1892 British Home Championship, for the third (and final) time England played matches against Wales and Ireland on the same day, 5 March 1892, winning both by a 2–0 margin.

Wales
For the Welsh game, England selected a team consisting mainly of players with Corinthian connections and awarded eight new caps. The new caps included professionals George Toone of Notts County in goal, Henry Lilley of Sheffield United (making his only England appearance at left-back) and George Kinsey (Wolverhampton Wanderers) at left-half. Joe Schofield a Staffordshire schoolteacher with Stoke City played at outside-left. The other débutantes were Anthony Hossack (Corinthian), William Winckworth (Old Westminsters), Robert Cunliffe Gosling (Old Etonians) and Rupert Sandilands (Old Westminsters). England were a little too skilful for the Welsh and ran out 2–0 winners with goals from Arthur Henfrey and Rupert Sandilands.

Ireland
Against Ireland, England issued a further five new caps. The most prominent débutante was Charlie Athersmith of Aston Villa at outside-right, who would continue to appear for England over the next eight years, making twelve appearances in all. He was accompanied by his club team-mate, Jack Devey. The other new caps were John Cox of Derby County, Michael Whitham of Sheffield United and John Pearson of Crewe Alexandra for each of whom this was their solitary England appearance. Pearson went on to have a successful career as a Football League referee, including the 1911 FA Cup Final. Harry Daft of Notts County was awarded the captaincy for his last of five England appearances and marked the occasion by scoring twice, either side of half-time.

Scotland
Scotland also beat both Wales and Ireland and, as a result, the outcome of the British Home Championship rested on the final game of the season (for the third consecutive year). England selected a much more experienced team than for the Wales and Ireland games, and only included four players who had featured in those games, including only one of the debutantes, George Toone in goal. Jack Reynolds, the West Bromwich Albion full-back, was selected to play for England for the first time, even though he had previously played five international games for Ireland, having scored against England on 15 March 1890. It had wrongly been assumed that Reynolds was born in Ireland; however, his birth certificate had proved that he was in fact born in Blackburn, thereby enabling him to make eight appearances for England. England rattled in four goals in the first 21 minutes, and although Scotland scored a late consolation goal, England were able to continue their excellent run of results against the Scots and claim the championship again.

* England score given first

Key
 A = Home match
 BHC = British Home Championship

Honours

Notes = Number in parentheses is the times that club has won that honour. * indicates new record for competition

League tables

The Football League

The Football Alliance

References

References

Details of Wales v England game
Details of Ireland v England game
Details of Scotland v England game
British Home Championship results on RSSF